Abdoel Hakim, abbreviated A. Hakim, was a physician who served as mayor of Padang from 1947 to 1949. Previously, he served as the Deputy Mayor of Padang (Dutch: Loco-Burgemeester Padang) from 1931 to 1942 during the rule of the Dutch East Indies.

Career
After graduating from School tot Opleiding van Inlandsche Artsen (STOVIA) in 1905, Abdoel Hakim was first assigned to his hometown, the city of Padangsidempuan. In 1910, he was reassigned to the city of Binjai and then reassigned to Tanjungpura.

His career in West Sumatra began in 1919, when he was assigned as the head of a local public health department.

In 1921, he was elected as a member of the City Council (Gemeenteraad) of Padang. He was re-elected as a member until 1942 (except from 1934 to 1938, as he was on leave).

In 1923, he was reassigned to Boyolali and Labuhan Deli. In the following year, he was reassigned to Padang where he served as the head of public health department of Padangsche Benedenlanden.

In 1931, he was appointed as the Deputy Mayor of Padang following the resignation of the previous deputy mayor. He held this position until 1942, when Japan occupied West Sumatra.

During Operation Product, Abdoel Hakim was elected by the Dutch as the Mayor of Padang to fill the vacancy after Mayor Bagindo Azizchan was shot on July 19, 1947.

References

External links 
 

Mayors of Padang
Minangkabau people
Mayors of places in Indonesia
STOVIA alumni